Khak Mardan (also Romanized as Khāk Mardān and Khākmardān; also known as Khaimar Dan, Khaymardan, and Kheymardan) is a village in Qarah Su Rural District, in the Central District of Khoy County, West Azerbaijan Province, Iran. At the 2006 census, its population was 650, in 141 families.

References 

Populated places in Khoy County